Qaraxıdır (also, Karakhydyr) is a village and municipality in the Goychay Rayon of Azerbaijan.  It has a population of 1,435.

References 

Populated places in Goychay District